Loop Mania is a mobile arcade video game developed by Umbrella and Games From Outer Space and published by Umbrella. It was released on 6 April 2016 for iOS and 27 May for Android.

Gameplay 

Loop Mania is an endless arcade video game which has the player controlling a white circle revolving around the inside of an outlined circle. The circle while revolving collects medium-sized dots that are called "coins" which add to the overall score above. Collecting multiple dots continuously results in an increased multiplier that adds to the score and collecting all progresses the player to another round, which increases in difficulty and occasionally changes color scheme.

Enemy circles can enter the circle and touching them can result in game over for the player. They can either be dodged or attacked by the player, which gains score as well.

In the start menu and website for the game, they showcase overall the number of coins collected globally. As of August 2016, Loop Mania has collected 1.81B coins overall currently.

Release 
The game was announced on 6 April 2016 on the Umbrella YouTube account and released on 20 April for the App Store and 27 May for Google Play.

References 

Android (operating system) games
IOS games
Mobile games
2016 video games
Video games developed in the United States